Pembroke is a city in the Canadian province of Ontario at the confluence of the Muskrat River and the Ottawa River in the Ottawa Valley. Pembroke is the location of the administrative headquarters of Renfrew County, though the city itself is politically independent.

History
The first European settler to the area now known as Pembroke was Daniel Fraser in 1823, who squatted on land that was discovered to have been granted to a man named Abel Ward. Ward later sold the land (where Moncion's Metro Supermarket is located) to Fraser, and nearby Fraser Street is named after the family.

Peter White, a veteran of the Royal Navy arrived in 1828, squatting beside Fraser on the land where Dairy Queen is now located. Other settlers followed, attracted by the growing lumbering operations of the area.

Originally named Miramichi, Pembroke became a police village in 1856. 

Pembroke is indirectly named after Sidney Herbert, First Admiralty Secretary from 1841 to 1845 and son of George Herbert, 11th Earl of Pembroke.

Pembroke was incorporated as a town in 1878 and as a city in 1971. It was named seat for Renfrew County in 1861. This set the stage for construction shortly thereafter on the Renfrew County Courthouse, which was finished in 1867, and the arrival of many civil servants, much wealth and much construction. In the 20-year period following 1861, Pembroke  basically became the city it is today in terms of layout and buildings, although many homes and other structures have been lost to time. A fire in 1918 destroyed much of Pembroke's downtown.

From 2005 to 2007, the courthouse and (now disused) jail were re-constructed into one building and historic renovations were also completed. Visitors on weekdays can view original 1867 jail cells in the basement, and the original courtroom, complete with a huge replica of the original brass light fixture. County meetings were held here for many years. Three hangings occurred at the indoor gallows inside the Courthouse, two in the 1870s and one in 1952.

Other historic buildings that survive in Pembroke include a historic synagogue, two original hospitals, the Dunlop mansion (Grey Gables Inn), the 'Munroe Block' downtown, and two houses belonging to the White family. A fire in 1918 downtown destroyed many buildings, including the Pembroke Opera House.

In 1898 Pembroke became the seat of the Roman Catholic Diocese of Pembroke.

Government 
Pembroke is managed by a Mayor-Council system, with a weak-mayor government form, for a total of one mayor and six councillors who are elected at large. The councillor whom is elected with the most votes is appointed Deputy Mayor.

Mayors of Pembroke 

 2014–2022: Michael Lemay
 2003–2014: Ed Jacyno
 2000–2003: Bob Pilot
 1994–2000: Les Scott

Economy

Pembroke is the largest commercial centre between North Bay and Ottawa.

Historically, forestry and farming formed the backbone of the local economy and remain important today. Local timber products include lumber, plywood, veneer, hydro poles and fibreboard.  Other local manufacturing operations produce office furniture.

CFB Petawawa in nearby Petawawa and Chalk River Laboratories of Atomic Energy of Canada Limited in Chalk River are also regional employers. Chalk River Laboratories is being restructured to a GOCO (Government Owned, Contractor Operated) Laboratory.

The economy also benefits from tourism, aided partly by Pembroke's location on the Trans-Canada Highway. Pembroke is a gateway to natural adventures on the Petawawa and Ottawa Rivers, Algonquin Park and to world-class white water rafting a short distance to the southwest.

Attractions

Local attractions include 30 historic murals in the downtown area depicting the history of the city, from steam engines to logging. Pembroke has more murals than almost any city in Canada.

At the Champlain Trail Pioneer Village and Museum the history of Ottawa Valley settlers comes alive inside the fully furnished schoolhouse, pioneer log home and church — all built in the 1800s. Other outdoor exhibits include train station, sawmill, blacksmith shop, stonelifter, carriage shed, woodworking shop, bake oven, smokehouse and a 1923 Bickle fire engine. The large museum features artifacts which range from fossils and Native Canadian arrowheads to furniture, clothing and manufactured products of Pembroke from various eras. There is also a replica of Samuel de Champlain's Astrolabe (he brought the original to the Valley in 1613), an original Cockburn pointer boat, Corliss steam engine, doctor's examination room, fancy parlour rooms, general store, hair salon and more.

The Pembroke Hydro Museum commemorates national hydro-electric development in Pembroke, including the first electric streetlights in Pembroke, and the first municipal building with electric lights (Victoria Hall).

The city is home to an annual Old Time Fiddling and Step Dancing Festival, which happens Labour Day weekend at Riverside Park. There are often up to 1400 RVs parked there for the week preceding the event.  Award-winning fiddler/step dancer April Verch is a Pembroke native.

Pembroke has a 600 plus seat community arts facility, Festival Hall Center of the Arts. The facility is operated by a Consortium consisting of The City of Pembroke and the Townships of Petawawa and Laurentian Valley. This facility hosts various local productions and top Canadian artists during the year.

Pembroke also is host to the annual Silver Stick Regional Minor League Hockey Tournament, which brings in several hundred children and youth on weekends in November and early December for regional qualifying games.

Pembroke's Public Library was designed by architect Francis Conroy Sullivan, a contemporary of Frank Lloyd Wright.

Sports
Pembroke has been the home of the Pembroke Lumber Kings Junior A Hockey Club since 1958.  They have been members of the Central Canada Hockey League since 1964, with the exception of the 1979–1980 season when the Pembroke Royals replaced them.
Pembroke has won the CCHL Championship a record five consecutive years.  In 2011, they won their first Canadian Junior A title, the Royal Bank Cup.

Demographics

Education

The city of Pembroke has three Anglophone Catholic primary schools; Cathedral Catholic School, Holy Name Catholic School and Our Lady of Lourdes Catholic School. There are also three public primary schools; Highview Public School, Rockwood Public School and Champlain Discovery Public School. The two biggest secondary schools are Bishop Smith Catholic School, which is the only secondary Catholic school in Pembroke and Petawawa, the neighboring town, and Fellowes High School, the only public Anglophone High School. There are two French schools for the French population of the city; École élémentaire et secondaire catholique Jeanne-Lajoie, which is the French catholic school, and École élémentaire et secondaire publique l’Équinoxe, which is a smaller French Public School.

All the Pembroke high schools are a part of the ‘Upper Ottawa Valley High School Athletic Association (UOVHSAA). UOVHSAA includes 11 high schools in the Renfrew County. The association encourages the “promotion and enhancement of the educational value of school sport”. Although not all schools are able to participate in every sport due to different levels of interest or number of interested students, they students can participate in rugby, volleyball, cross country, football, basketball, alpine skiing, hockey, cross country skiing, snowboarding, curling, wrestling, badminton, golf, soccer, tennis and track and field. The possibilities for students are endless and participation can lead to competing in different associations to represent not only the school, but also the city itself.

The Ottawa-based Algonquin College also has a campus in the heart of Pembroke, right by the Ottawa River. The campus doesn't offer as many programs as the Ottawa campus, but it offers some unique programs that wouldn't be available in the big city.  The Outdoor Adventure and Outdoor Adventure Naturalist, Forestry Technician, and Environmental Technician programs are unique to Pembroke due to its location by the water and Algonquin Provincial Park.

Healthcare services
The Pembroke Regional Hospital is the city's only hospital with many different services available. It is an acute care hospital with services such as medicine, surgery, maternal and childcare, mental health care, regional rehabilitation, emergency and intensive care. The hospital is affiliated with the University of Ottawa's Faculty of Medicine and recognized as a state of the art teaching hospital.
Aside from the hospital's doctors, many other doctors practice independently. There is also the Integrated Health Centre, with its focus on assisting the public to improve their health and to prevent pain and illness before problems occur.

Mental health care in Pembroke is available throughout different locations. The Mental Health Services of Renfrew County is the mental health ward in the Pembroke Regional Hospital. For youth, there is the Phoenix Centre for Children and Families that is run by a volunteer board of directors and funded by the provincial government.  The Phoenix Centre for Children and Families offers walk-in counselling for those who need immediate help or advice. There is also the Robbie Dean Family Counselling Centre, that offers a wide variety of services such as a Suicide Prevention & Crisis Clinic, PTSD/OSI Peer Support Group, a Youth Of Parents who Experience Occupational Trauma Program, Support Group for LGBTQ Youth, and a Parent Peer Support Group. They also hold many community events to help support mental health initiatives.

Media
Most broadcast media transmitting in the Pembroke area are rebroadcasters of stations from Ottawa, Arnprior or Toronto. CHVR-FM is the only broadcast station directly based in the Pembroke area itself. Pembroke also remains CHRO-TV's official city of license, although the station currently operates out of studios in Ottawa.

Radio
 FM 88.7 - CBOF-FM-9, Ici Radio-Canada Première (Chapeau, Quebec)
 FM 92.5 - CBCD, CBC Radio One
 FM 96.7 - CHVR, country music
 FM 99.9 - CKQB-1, contemporary hit radio
 FM 100.7 - CHRI-2, Christian
 FM 104.9 - CIMY, adult contemporary

Television
Except for CIVP-DT, all channels listed below are available on Cogeco, the local cable system for Pembroke.

 Channel 5: CHRO-TV, CTV Two
 Channel 23.1: CIVP-DT, Télé-Québec (from Chapeau, Quebec; rebroadcasts CIVM-DT, Montreal)
 Channel 47: CJOH-TV-47, CTV (analogue rebroadcaster of CJOH-DT Ottawa)
 Cogeco Cable 12: TV Cogeco

Print
The city's main daily newspaper was The Daily Observer. The Observer ceased print publication in 2018 and is now exclusively online.

Notable people

Jason Blaine, country singer
Sarah Boudens, rower and kayaker who participated in the 2008 Beijing Olympics
Harry Cameron, NHL player and Hockey Hall of Fame inductee
Hec Clouthier, federal member of parliament
Bruce Cockburn spent his childhood on a farm near Pembroke.
Tom Green, comedian born in Pembroke who later moved to Ottawa.
Hugh Lehman, NHL player and Hockey Hall of Fame inductee
Paul Martin Sr., noted lawyer, politician and father of former Prime Minister Paul Martin was raised in Pembroke.
Richard John Neuhaus, priest and editor-in-chief of First Things
Frank Nighbor, NHL player and Hockey Hall of Fame inductee who was nicknamed "The Pembroke Peach"
Dan O'Connor, businessman and prospector born and raised in Pembroke
Wayne Rostad, songwriter, singer, story teller, spent his youth in Pembroke.
Patrick Thomas Stone, United States District Court judge, born in Pembroke.
Bob Stutt, puppeteer who performed on Fraggle Rock, Under the Umbrella Tree and The Big Comfy Couch.
Peter Togni, composer
Jordon Zadorozny, frontman of rock band Blinker the Star

Forest fire protection history

The Pembroke Forest Fire District was founded by Ontario's former Department of Lands and Forests (now the MNR) in 1922 as one of 17 districts to help protect Ontario's forests from fire by early detection from fire towers. The headquarters for the district were housed in the town. It was the central location for 15 fire tower lookouts, including the towers in Algonquin Park. The 15 towers included: Wilberforce, Mt. Edna, Sherwood, Murchison, Preston, Clancy, Fitzgerald, Brent, Big Crow Lake, White Trout Lake, Stonecliffe, Deux Rivières, Osler, Lauder and Skymount. When a fire was spotted in the forest a towerman would get the degree bearings from his respective tower and radio back the information to headquarters. When one or more towermen from other towers in the area would also call in their bearings, the forest rangers at headquarters could get a 'triangulation' read and plot the exact location of the fire on their map. This way a team of forest firefighters could be dispatched as soon as possible to get the fire under control. These towers would all be phased out after aerial fire fighting techniques were employed in the 1970s.

See also
Pembroke Airport
Kichesipirini
List of francophone communities in Ontario

References

External links

 

 
Cities in Ontario
Single-tier municipalities in Ontario